Pueblo Viejo may refer to: 

Argentina
 Pueblo Viejo, Salta
Belize
 Pueblo Viejo, Belize, a village in Toledo District, Belize
Colombia
 Pueblo Viejo, Magdalena (municipality)
Dominican Republic
 Pueblo Viejo, Dominican Republic (municipality)
Ecuador
 Pueblo Viejo, Ecuador
Mexico
 Pueblo Viejo Municipality, Veracruz, in the state of Veracruz
 Pueblo Viejo, Michoacán, in the state of Michoacán
 Pueblo Viejo, Acajete
 Pueblo Viejo, Antiguo Morelos
 Pueblo Viejo, Aquila
 Pueblo Viejo, Arteaga
 Pueblo Viejo, Candelaria Loxicha
 Pueblo Viejo, Chilapa de Álvarez
 Pueblo Viejo, Coacoatzintla
 Pueblo Viejo, Coahuayutla de José María Izazaga
 Pueblo Viejo, Coatepec
 Pueblo Viejo, Cochoapa el Grande
 Pueblo Viejo, Colima
 Pueblo Viejo, Cotaxtla
 Pueblo Viejo, Culiacán
 Pueblo Viejo, Juchipila
 Pueblo Viejo, Jungapeo
 Pueblo Viejo, La Huacana
 Pueblo Viejo, Las Choapas
 Pueblo Viejo, Magdalena Peñasco
 Pueblo Viejo, Metlatónoc
 Pueblo Viejo, Minatitlán
 Pueblo Viejo, Misantla
 Pueblo Viejo, Morelia
 Pueblo Viejo, Namiquipa
 Pueblo Viejo, Ocampo
 Pueblo Viejo, Pihuamo
 Pueblo Viejo, Quitupan
 Pueblo Viejo, San Ignacio
 Pueblo Viejo, San Juan Mixtepec -Dto. 08 -
 Pueblo Viejo, San Juan Tamazola
 Pueblo Viejo, San Mateo Yucutindoo
 Pueblo Viejo, San Sebastián Río Hondo
 Pueblo Viejo, Santa Inés de Zaragoza
 Pueblo Viejo, Santa María del Oro
 Pueblo Viejo, Santiago Amoltepec
 Pueblo Viejo, Santiago Ixtayutla
 Pueblo Viejo, Santo Tomás
 Pueblo Viejo, Sinaloa
 Pueblo Viejo, Tamazula
 Pueblo Viejo, Tequila
 Pueblo Viejo, Tihuatlán
 Pueblo Viejo, Tlapa de Comonfort
 Pueblo Viejo, Tlaquiltenango
 Pueblo Viejo, Tolimán
 Pueblo Viejo, Turicato
 Pueblo Viejo, Zacapu
 Pueblo Viejo, Zapotlanejo
 Pueblo Viejo, Zimatlán de Álvarez
 Pueblo Viejo, Zirándaro
Puerto Rico
 Pueblo Viejo, Guaynabo, Puerto Rico, a barrio of Guaynabo, Puerto Rico and the first settlement in Puerto Rico originally called Caparra